Phytophthora psychrophila is a semi-papillate plant pathogen that mainly infects European oak. It differs from other species of the genus (like P. ilicis) by its sympodially branched primary hyphae, the high variation in size and shape of the sporangia and shorter pedicels.

References

Further reading
 
 
 

psychrophila
Water mould plant pathogens and diseases
Tree diseases
Protists described in 2002